Igor Gjuzelov or Igor Đuzelov (born 2 April 1976 in Strumica) is a retired Macedonian professional football player. Gjuzelov is a central defender.

Club career
Gjuzelov played for Belgian First division side Cercle Brugge until the 2010–11 season.

International career
He made his senior debut for Macedonia in a March 1998 friendly match against Bulgaria in Skopje and has earned a total of 18 caps, scoring 1 goal. His final international was an October 2003 friendly away against Ukraine.

References

External links
 
 Igor Gjuzelov player info at the official Cercle Brugge site 
 Cerclemuseum.be 
http://www.ffm.com.mk/eng/igrac_rep.asp?igrac=225
 

1976 births
Living people
Sportspeople from Strumica
Association football central defenders
Macedonian footballers
North Macedonia international footballers
FK Belasica players
FK Sileks players
HNK Hajduk Split players
FC Shakhtar Donetsk players
FC Shakhtar-2 Donetsk players
FC Metalurh Donetsk players
Hapoel Petah Tikva F.C. players
Cercle Brugge K.S.V. players
Macedonian First Football League players
Croatian Football League players
Ukrainian Premier League players
Ukrainian First League players
Israeli Premier League players
Belgian Pro League players
Macedonian expatriate footballers
Expatriate footballers in Croatia
Macedonian expatriate sportspeople in Croatia
Expatriate footballers in Ukraine
Macedonian expatriate sportspeople in Ukraine
Expatriate footballers in Israel
Macedonian expatriate sportspeople in Israel
Expatriate footballers in Belgium
Macedonian expatriate sportspeople in Belgium